Christoffer Nygaard (born 24 March 1986, in Gentofte) is a Danish auto racing driver who currently competes in the FIA World Endurance Championship.

Racing career

Karting
Nygaard started his karting career in 2001. His best result while karting was 3rd in the Nordic Formula A Championship in his last season in 2004.

Touring Car racing
After karting for four years, Nygaard made his auto racing debut in 2005 in the German ADAC Volkswagen Polo Cup.  After racing in the ADAC Volkswagen Polo Cup from 2005 to 2006 Nygaard switched to SEAT Leon Supercopa Germany for the 2007 season racing for Fischer Racing. In 2008 he finished 3rd in the championship.

GT racing
For 2009 Nygaard switched from the SEAT Leon Supercopa to a Ford GT GT3, still driving for Fischer Racing, in ADAC GT Masters and the FIA GT3 European Championship. He continued in FIA GT3 for 2010 and debuted in the FIA GT1 World Championship and the 24 Hours of Le Mans the same year. Nygaard continued racing in the FIA GT3 and FIA GT1 for 2011.

In 2012 Nygaard returned to ADAC GT Masters. Since 2012 Nygaard has been racing in the FIA World Endurance Championship for Aston Martin Racing.

Racing record

24 Hours of Le Mans results

†Simonsen was killed on Lap 3 of the race.  Neither Poulsen nor Nygaard had driven in the race at the time of the crash.

Complete FIA World Endurance Championship results

Coaching 
Christoffer Nygaard is currently an instructor at Power Racing Gokart Academy in Herlev, Denmark where he runs the Race Club, a regularly held class where he provides coaching services to novice and advanced Gokart drivers.

References

External links
 

1986 births
Living people
People from Gentofte Municipality
Danish racing drivers
ADAC GT Masters drivers
FIA GT1 World Championship drivers
FIA World Endurance Championship drivers
24 Hours of Le Mans drivers
24 Hours of Daytona drivers
WeatherTech SportsCar Championship drivers
European Le Mans Series drivers
Sportspeople from the Capital Region of Denmark
Aston Martin Racing drivers
24H Series drivers